, also known as Rope Detective, is a 1996 Japanese V-Cinema erotic thriller directed by Hitoshi Hoshino (Jin Hoshino) and starring Yukijirō Hotaru.

Plot synopsis
Shiro is the Bondage Master who has a special technique with ropes and women. When a model is found murdered and tied with Shiro's signature style, he has to find the real murderer to clear his name while eluding the vengeance of the model's yakuza boyfriend.

Cast
 Yukijirō Hotaru as Shiro
 Yokiru Ikuta as Rumi
 Ai Yasunaga as Keiko
 Hiromitsu Noriyasu as Hitoshi
 Hitomi Shiraishi as Saya

English voice cast
 Sandy Williams as Shiro
 Suzy Prue as Rumi
 Petra Kosic as Keiko
 Richard St. Louis as Hitoshi
 Pink Champale as Saya
 Kandi Snackwell as Reiko
 Tristan Goddard as Vendor
 Jason Maxwell as Akiyama
 Barbara Busch as Satomi
 Carrie Montgomery as Rina
 Ted as Yamaguchi
 Fergus Lawless as Masaya
 Wop-Wop as Miyoshi
 Eric Snare as Sano
 Ted Newly as Kayama

Release
The Bondage Master was released as a VHS video in Japan on April 26, 1996 by Tōhokushinsha. Central Park Media had licensed the film under their Asia Pulp Cinema label and released it on an English subtitled VHS on September 26, 2000. Central Park Media also released a DVD featuring an English audio track on June 8, 2004.

See also
Sadism and masochism in fiction

References

External links
 

1996 films
BDSM in films
1990s erotic thriller films
Japanese erotic thriller films
Central Park Media
1990s Japanese films